John Ibbitson (born 1955) is a Canadian journalist. Since 1999, he has been a political writer and columnist for The Globe and Mail.

Career 
Ibbitson graduated from the University of Toronto in 1979 with a B.A. in English. After university, he pursued a career as a playwright, his most notable play being Mayonnaise, which debuted in December 1980 at the Phoenix Theatre in Toronto, Ontario. The play went on to national production and was adapted to a TV broadcast in 1983. In the mid-1980s, Ibbitson switched over to writing young adult fiction, including the science fiction novel Starcrosser (1990). He also wrote two full-length novels, 1812: Jeremy's War and The Night Hazel Came to Town. The Landing followed in 2008 - a winner of the 2008 Governor General's Award for English-language children's literature. Apart from the latter Ibbitson has been nominated for several awards for other works, including a Governor General's Award nomination for 1812. Hazel received a nomination for the Trillium Book Award and the City of Toronto Book Award. His journalism has also been nominated for a National Newspaper Award.

Ibbitson entered the University of Western Ontario in 1987. Upon graduating with an M.A. in journalism one year later, he joined the Ottawa Citizen, where he worked as a city reporter and columnist. He covered Ontario politics from 1995 to 2001, working for the Ottawa Citizen, Southam News, the National Post and The Globe and Mail. In August 2001, Ibbitson accepted the post of Washington bureau chief at The Globe and Mail, returning to Canada one year later to take up the post of political affairs columnist. He moved back to Washington as a columnist in May 2007, returning to Ottawa as bureau chief in September 2009. In December 2010 he became the paper's chief political writer. In that role, he has also frequently appeared on Canadian television news programs as a pundit and political analyst. In 2015 he became writer-at-large.

In 2013, Ibbitson and Darrell Bricker co-authored the book The Big Shift: The Seismic Change in Canadian Politics, Business, and Culture and What It Means for Our Future. One of the terms used in the book was the “Laurentian Consensus,” which Ibbitson coined in a 2011 article about the 2011 Canadian Federal Election as "the political, academic, cultural, media and business elites" in central Canada who were responsible for shaping Canadian identity. He associated the  "Laurentian Elite”  with the Liberal Party of Canada, while associating "The Conservative Coalition" with prairie populism that dominates Western Canada's politics. Ibbitson suggested that the gradual decline of the Laurentian Consensus was due to infighting within the Liberal Party, demographic changes in the 905 region that shifted "Ontario's orientation toward the West", rising oil prices fueling economic and population growth in Western Canada, a weakening Quebec separatism movement, and a growing sense of patriotism. However, he argued that the Laurentian Elite can regain influence if they understand "who rejected it and why".

In January 2014 Ibbitson began a one-year leave of absence from the Globe, to serve as a senior fellow at the Centre for International Governance Innovation and to work on a biography of Prime Minister Stephen Harper, which was published in August 2015. In 2016, the book won the Shaughnessy Cohen Prize for Political Writing.

Ibbitson and Darrell Bricker co-authored the book "Empty Planet: The Shock of Global Population Decline," which was published separately in 2019 in the United States, Great Britain and Canada, and in Chinese, Spanish, Japanese and Korean.

He is married to Grant Burke.

Publications

Non-fiction
Promised Land: Inside the Mike Harris Revolution (Prentice Hall, 1997)
Loyal No More: Ontario's Struggle for a Separate Destiny (HarperCollins, 2001)
The Polite Revolution: Perfecting the Canadian Dream (McClelland & Stewart, 2005)
Open & Shut: Why America Has Barack Obama and Canada Has Stephen Harper (McClelland & Stewart, 2009)
The Big Shift: The Seismic Change in Canadian Politics, Business, and Culture and What It Means for Our Future with Darrell Bricker (HarperCollins, 2013) 
Stephen Harper, a biography of Canada's 22nd Prime Minister (McClelland & Stewart, (2015)
Empty Planet: The Shock of Global Population Decline, with Darrell Bricker (McClelland & Stewart, 2019)

Fiction
Jeremy's War: 1812 (Maxwell Macmillan, 1991)
The Night Hazel Came to Town (Maxwell Macmillan, 1993)
The Landing (KidsCan Press, 2008)

References

Canadian columnists
Canadian political journalists
Canadian male novelists
1955 births
Living people
20th-century Canadian dramatists and playwrights
20th-century Canadian novelists
21st-century Canadian novelists
University of Toronto alumni
University of Western Ontario alumni
The Globe and Mail columnists
People from Gravenhurst, Ontario
Canadian LGBT journalists
Canadian gay writers
Canadian writers of young adult literature
Governor General's Award-winning children's writers
Canadian male dramatists and playwrights
CTV Television Network people
20th-century Canadian male writers
21st-century Canadian male writers
Canadian male non-fiction writers
21st-century Canadian LGBT people
20th-century Canadian LGBT people